Karel Zeman (3 November 1910 – 5 April 1989) was a Czech film director, artist, production designer and animator, best known for directing fantasy films combining live-action footage with animation. Because of his creative use of special effects and animation in his films, he has often been called the "Czech Méliès".

Life
Zeman was born on 3 November 1910 in Ostroměř (near Nová Paka) in what was then Austria-Hungary. At his parents' insistence, he studied business at high school in Kolín. In the 1920s, he studied at a French advertising school, and worked at an advertising studio in Marseilles until 1936. It was in France that he first worked with animation, filming an ad for soap. He then returned to his home country (by now the First Czechoslovak Republic, known as Czechoslovakia), after visiting Egypt, Yugoslavia, and Greece. Back in Czechoslovakia, Zeman advertised for Czech firms like Baťa and Tatra. In 1939 he attempted to make an extended stay in Casablanca, but was barred by the Protectorate of Bohemia and Moravia established by Nazi Germany; unable to get the necessary papers in time, Zeman was required to remain in his home country during the German occupation of Czechoslovakia.

During the war he worked as a head of advertisement at Dům služeb in Brno. Film director Elmar Klos came to Brno to film a newsreel about window-dressing competition, which Zeman won. Klos offered Zeman a job at Zlín's animation studio. After some consideration (his wife and children were already established in Brno), Zeman accepted the job in 1943. At the studio, Zeman worked as an assistant to the pioneering animator Hermína Týrlová, and in 1945 he became the director of the stop-motion animation production group. The same year, in collaboration with Bořivoj Zeman, he made his first short film, Vánoční sen ("A Christmas Dream"). The short, which combined animated puppets with live-action footage, marked the beginning of Zeman's experiments with new techniques and genres.

Zeman then went on to solo work, including a series of satirical cartoon shorts starring a puppet called Mr. Prokouk; the series was a wide success and the character became a Czech favorite. A bet Zeman accepted, challenging him to discover a method of working with glass in animation, led to the unusual short Inspirace ("Inspiration," 1948), which tells a wordless, poetic love story using animated glass figurines. Zeman then went on to the half-hour film Král Lávra (1950), based on the satirical poem by Karel Havlíček Borovský; the film won a National Award. In 1952, Zeman completed his first feature film, Poklad ptačího ostrova ("The Treasure of Bird Island," 1952). It was based on a Persian fairy tale and took its visual inspiration from Persian paintings, combining multiple animation techniques in two- and three-dimensional space.

It was in 1955, however, that Zeman began the work for which he is best known: six feature films designed artistically to combine live-action and animation techniques. These were:

Cesta do pravěku (1955), inspired by Jules Verne's Journey to the Center of the Earth and the paintings of Zdeněk Burian. In 1966 a partly re-filmed US version was released as Journey to the Beginning of Time.
Vynález zkázy (1958), based on Verne's Facing the Flag, and filmed to emulate the original illustrations for Verne's novels
Baron Prášil (1961), celebrating the legendary Baron Munchausen and the engravings of Gustave Doré
Bláznova kronika (1964), a satire of the Thirty Years' War, suggested by the drawings of Matthäus Merian
Ukradená vzducholoď (1966), inspired by the Verne novels Two Years' Vacation and The Mysterious Island, the Art Nouveau style, and the 1891 Prague Centennial Exhibition
Na kometě (1970), an anti-war fantasy based on Verne's Hector Servadac

He was a member of the jury at the 2nd Moscow International Film Festival in 1961 and at the 7th Moscow International Film Festival in 1971. The Czechoslovakian government awarded him the title of National Artist in 1970.

After his live-action films, Zeman experimented with more classical forms of animation, beginning with seven shorts about Sinbad the Sailor which were then expanded into the feature film Pohádky tisíce a jedné noci (1974). His final films were Čarodějův učeň (1977), from the novel The Satanic Mill by Otfried Preußler, and Pohádka o Honzíkovi a Mařence (1980). On 3 November 1980, in celebration of Zeman's seventieth birthday, President Gustáv Husák awarded him the Order of the Republic.

Zeman died in Gottwaldov (present-day Zlín) on 5 April 1989, a few months before the Velvet Revolution.

Legacy
Zeman's works were influential to the Czech animator Jan Švankmajer, as well as to the filmmaker Terry Gilliam, who said of Zeman: "He did what I'm still trying to do, which is to try and combine live action with animation. His Doré-esque backgrounds were wonderful." The filmmaker Tim Burton described Zeman's creative process as "extremely inspirational" to his own work, and identified Zeman and the animator Ray Harryhausen as his influences "in terms of doing stop motion and a more handmade quality … Karel Zeman did that amazingly." Harryhausen himself also spoke in interviews of his admiration for Zeman, and the films of the director Wes Anderson have included homages to Zeman's works.

The film historian Georges Sadoul identified Zeman as having "widened the horizons of the eighth art, animation," adding:

On the occasion of an animation exhibition in 2010, curators at the Barbican Centre said of Zeman: "although his influence outweighs his global fame, he is unarguably one of the greatest animators of all time."

In 2012 a museum dedicated to Zeman and his work, the Muzeum Karla Zemana, opened near the Charles Bridge in Prague.

Filmography

Feature films

Short films

References

External links

Karel Zeman filmography 
Karel Zeman: Genius of Animated Film at SME.sk 
Gallery of Czech stop-action animation including clips from The Fabulous World of Karel Zeman.
A Strange Introduction to Karel Zeman: The Czech Visionary (TCM Movie Morlocks)

 
1910 births
1989 deaths
People from Jičín District
People from the Kingdom of Bohemia
Czech animators
Czech film directors
Stop motion animators
Czechoslovak film directors
Czech animated film directors
Czech animated film producers
Czechoslovak expatriates in France